Blood River is situated in KwaZulu-Natal, South Africa. This river has its sources in the hills south-east of Utrecht; leaving the highlands it is joined by two important tributaries that originate in the Schurveberg, after which it flows meandering through a sandy plain. The Blood River is a tributary of the Buffalo River, which is a tributary of the Tugela River which it joins from the north-east.

This river is so named after the battle in which Zulu King Dingane was defeated by Andries Pretorius and his men on 16 December 1838 and the water turned red from the blood of Zulu men who died here en masse. It was a fight with 464 Boers and over 10,000 Zulus. The battle was celebrated as a 16 December holiday called the Day of the Vow in apartheid South Africa. In 1994, after the end of Apartheid, it was replaced by the Day of Reconciliation, an annual holiday also on 16 December.

The Blood River Vlei, located about 20 km to the south-west of Vryheid, is one of the biggest inland wetlands in South Africa and the wintering place of migratory birds such as ducks and geese.

See also 
 List of rivers of South Africa

Bibliography 
 Kajsa Norman, Bridge Over Blood River: The Rise and Fall of the Afrikaners, Hurst and Company, London, 2016, .

References

External links

North-West Zululand birding sites
Official website of the Blood river Vow Committee, Blood river Vow Committee

Tugela River
Rivers of KwaZulu-Natal